Vitor Gabriel Alves Nery (born 23 November 1997) is a Brazilian footballer who plays as a midfielder for Portuguese club Mafra.

Career
Vitor Gabriel grew in the Santos youth ranks and then he was loaned to the B-team. Gainare Tottori wanted to scout him, so GM Masayuki Okano and returning Fernandinho went to Brazil to see with their own eyes the winger and another player, Leonardo. In January 2018, the Tottori-based club signed both class '97 for their incoming 2018 season.

On 29 June 2021, he signed with Mafra in Portugal.

Club statistics
Updated to 29 August 2018.

References

External links

Profile at J. League
Profile at Gainare Tottori

1997 births
Sportspeople from Minas Gerais
Living people
Brazilian footballers
Association football midfielders
Gainare Tottori players
Manama Club players
Riffa SC players
C.D. Mafra players
J3 League players
Bahraini Premier League players
Liga Portugal 2 players
Brazilian expatriate footballers
Expatriate footballers in Japan
Brazilian expatriate sportspeople in Japan
Expatriate footballers in Bahrain
Brazilian expatriate sportspeople in Bahrain
Expatriate footballers in Portugal
Brazilian expatriate sportspeople in Portugal